The 1949 All-Southern Conference football team consists of American football players chosen by the Associated Press (AP) for the All-Southern Conference football team for the 1949 college football season.

All-Southern Conference selections

Backs
 Charlie Justice, North Carolina (AP-1)
 Billy Cox, Duke (AP-1)
 Joseph "Buddy" Lex, William & Mary (AP-1)
 Bill Gregus, Wake Forest (AP-1)

Ends
 Art Weiner, North Carolina (AP-1)
 Vito Ragazzo, William & Mary (AP-1)

Tackles
 Louis Allen, Duke (AP-1)
 Ray Krouse, Maryland (AP-1)

Guards
 Ray Cicia, Wake Forest (AP-1)
 Charles Musser, North Carolina State (AP-1)

Centers
 Irv Holdash, North Carolina (AP-1)

Key
AP = Associated Press

See also
1949 College Football All-America Team

References

All-Southern Conference football team
All-Southern Conference football teams